Alfred Cassirer (29 July 1875 – 11 July 1932) was a German engineer, entrepreneur and art collector.

Life 
Born  in Görlitz, Cassirer came from the entrepreneurial Cassirer family and was the youngest son of Louis Cassirer and a brother of Paul, Hugo and Richard Cassirer. Together with his brother Hugo Cassirer and his uncle Julius Cassirer owner of the company  in Berlin-Hakenfelde. Cassirer was also the second representative of Section I of the "Maschinenbau- und Kleineisenindustrie-".

He was also an active hot air ballooner, co-founder of the Kaiserlicher Aero-Club at the Johannisthal Air Field near Berlin and won 1st prize in Class 3 in the 1908 International Race with his balloon "Hewald" in the endurance flight.

On 15 July 1912, Alfred Cassirer married Hannah Sotschek (1887-1974), who, after divorcing around 1923, married Leo Blumenreich in a second marriage. The marriage produced the philosopher Eva Cassirer (1920-2009).

Cassirer died two and a half weeks before his 57th birthday on 11 July 1932 in Berlin. His grave is located in the state-owned Friedhof Heerstraße in Berlin-Westend. The grave monument consists of an unadorned plinth, consisting of three dimension stones from shell limestone, on which stands a relief showing six grazing sheep. This frieze was created by the firm Schleicher & Co. after a drawing by August Gaul entitled "Sheep in the Campagna".

The works on display included drawings by Adolph von Menzel, works by Max Liebermann and Max Slevogt, sculptures by Ernst Barlach, Georg Kolbe and August Gaul. Among the main works in the collection were paintings by French artists such as Gustave Courbet, Édouard Manet, Claude Monet, Edgar Degas, Pierre-Auguste Renoir, Camille Pissarro, Alfred Sisley and Paul Cézanne.

 References 

 Further reading 
 Sigrid Bauschinger: Die Cassirers. Unternehmer, Kunsthändler, Philosophen. C. H. Beck, Munich 2015, pp. 19 f., 51, 55, 57, 96, 118, 125, 128f., 142, 145, 178, 220, 225, 229, 333, 345, 357, 393.
 Eine Impressionisten-Galerie im Ermeler-Haus. In Vossische Zeitung'', 11 March 1933

External links 

Businesspeople from Berlin
20th-century German businesspeople
German art collectors
1875 births
1932 deaths
People from Görlitz